Roger Veeser (8 September 1919 – 27 February 2010) was a Swiss athlete. He competed in the men's hammer throw at the 1952 Summer Olympics.

References

1919 births
2010 deaths
Athletes (track and field) at the 1952 Summer Olympics
Swiss male hammer throwers
Olympic athletes of Switzerland
Place of birth missing